Dennis Eric Nineham (27 September 1921 – 9 May 2016) was a British theologian and academic, who served as Warden of Keble College, Oxford, from 1969 to 1979, as well as holding chairs in theology at the universities of London, Cambridge, and Bristol.

Early life and education
Nineham was born on 27 September 1921. He was educated at King Edward VI School, in Southampton, Hampshire, then a grammar school. He studied Literae Humaniores (classics) and theology at The Queen's College, Oxford. He graduated from the University of Oxford with a first class honours Bachelor of Arts degree in 1943. He then entered Lincoln Theological College, an Anglican theological college, to undertake a year's training in preparation for the ordained ministry of the Church of England.

Career

Ordained ministry
Nineham was ordained in the Church of England as a deacon in 1944 and as a priest in 1945. He then served as Assistant Chaplain at Queen's College, Oxford. In 1946, he was elected a fellow and appointed as the College Chaplain.

During his time at the University of Bristol, Nineham was an honorary canon of Bristol Cathedral.

Academic career
He was appointed professor of Biblical and historical theology at King's College London in 1954, becoming professor of divinity at the University of London in 1958. In 1964, he was appointed Regius Professor of Divinity at the University of Cambridge, a post held in conjunction with a fellowship at Emmanuel College. He returned to Oxford in 1969, as warden of Keble College, a post that he held until 1979; he was appointed to an honorary fellowship of Keble in the following year, and to an honorary fellowship of Queen's in 1991.  Between 1980 and 1986, he was professor of theology and head of the theology department at the University of Bristol; he was also an honorary canon of Bristol Cathedral for this period.

His publications include The Study of Divinity (1960), The Gospel of Saint Mark (1963), The Use and Abuse of the Bible (1976) and Christianity Mediaeval and Modern (1993).  He edited various theological works, contributed to others, including The Myth of God Incarnate (1977), and made a number of television appearances, including as part of the controversial Channel 4 series, Jesus: The Evidence in 1984.

Family
His son is Chris Nineham, deputy leader of the Stop The War Coalition.

Later life
He died on 9 May 2016 at the age of 94.

References

1921 births
2016 deaths
British theologians
20th-century English Anglican priests
Alumni of The Queen's College, Oxford
Fellows of The Queen's College, Oxford
Academics of King's College London
Academics of the University of London
Fellows of Emmanuel College, Cambridge
Regius Professors of Divinity (University of Cambridge)
Wardens of Keble College, Oxford
Academics of the University of Bristol
Academics of the University of Cambridge
People educated at King Edward VI School, Southampton